{{DISPLAYTITLE:C33H42N4O6}}
The molecular formula C33H42N4O6 (molar mass: 590.71 g/mol, exact mass: 590.310435 u) may refer to:

 Phycourobilin, a tetrapyrrole 
 Urobilin, a tetrapyrrole 

Molecular formulas